Raymond C. Stebbins (born c. 1944) is an American attorney and political activist and a member of the Democratic Party. He is best known as the winner of the Democratic New Hampshire Vice Presidential primary in 2008.

A 64-year-old resident (as of February 2008) of Weymouth, Massachusetts, he is a retired corporate attorney. He has never held public office, but is frequently involved in political campaigns.

The Vice Presidential primary is a very low key event and usually no prominent candidate participates. The Vice Presidential primary also has no impact on the nomination process. Some past vice presidential nominees, however, have won as write-ins (for example, Estes Kefauver, Al Gore, and John Edwards).

Stebbins won the primary with 46.93% of the vote. During his campaign, his bumper stickers included the phrases "Vote for Ray Stebbins, Vice President", "easy to remove" and "so you wouldn’t have it on there for years."

Stebbins cited Harry Truman as his political hero and favorite Vice President.

Electoral history 
Note: * means write-in candidates

2008 New Hampshire Democratic Vice Presidential primary.
 Raymond Stebbins - 50,485 (46.93%)
 William Bryk - 22,965 (21.35%)
 John Edwards* - 10,553 (9.81%)
 Barack Obama*  6,402 (5.95%)
 Bill Richardson* - 5,525 (5.14%)
 Hillary Clinton* - 3,419 (3.18%)
 Joe Biden* - 1,512 (1.41%)
 Al Gore* - 966 (0.90%)
 Dennis Kucinich* - 762 (0.71%)
 Bill Clinton* - 388 (0.36%)
 John McCain* - 293 (0.27%)
 Christopher Dodd* - 224 (0.21%)
 Ron Paul* - 176 (0.16%)
 Jack Barnes, Jr.* - 95 (0.09%)
 Mike Gravel* - 91 (0.09%)
 Joe Lieberman* - 67 (0.06%)
 Mitt Romney* - 66 (0.06%)
 Mike Huckabee* - 63 (0.06%)
 Rudy Giuliani* - 46 (0.04%)
 Darrel Hunter* - 20 (0.02%)

References

External links 
 OurCampaign profile

2008 United States vice-presidential candidates
21st-century American politicians
Massachusetts Democrats
1940s births
Living people
Massachusetts lawyers